Mayurbhanj Law College commonly known as MLC is a non Government law institute situated at Takatpur in Baripada of Mayurbhanj district in the Indian state of Odisha. It offers 3 years LL.B. and 2 years Master of Laws (LL.M) courses approved by the Bar Council of India (BCI) and it is affiliated to North Odisha University.

History
Mayurbhanj Law College was established on 22 October 1978. On 13 April 1987, the college building was inaugurated by the then Governor of Odisha Mr. Bishambhar Nath Pande. It has many scholar students.

References

Educational institutions established in 1978
1978 establishments in Orissa
Universities and colleges in Odisha
Law schools in Odisha